The village of Nimeta is located 15 km near the city of Baroda, India.  The name Nimeta is always used with Ajwa; the entire region is commonly referred to as Ajwa Nimeta. 

Nimeta has a water treatment plant. Its gardens make the town a popular tourist place.

References 

Villages in Vadodara district